WRWD-FM (107.3 MHz, "Country 107.3") is a country music radio station licensed to Highland, New York and primarily serving the mid-Hudson Valley of New York. The station broadcasts at 330 watts ERP from a tower near Illinois Mountain in Marlborough, New York shared with sister station WBWZ.  The station is owned and operated by iHeartMedia, Inc.  Its studios are in Arlington, New York.

History
WRWD was put on the air in September 1989 by apple orchard owner William H. ("Bud") Walker who used the call letters to pay tribute to his children, Rachel, William Jr, and David. WRWD took on the country format long avoided by area stations at a time when past failures daunted existing owners and out-of-market stations from New York City, Albany and Hartford were garnering significant shares in the Hudson Valley. At the outset, most programming on the station was satellite fed with former WEOK personality Ken Gonyea at the helm for Mornings.

1990 saw a major change as Walker gave control of the station to Thom Williams who replaced Ken Gonyea in mornings and as program director while taking the station in a new country direction. WRWD at this time added an AM simulcast in 1170 WWLE, a daytime station licensed to Cornwall-on-Hudson which would soon take on the WRWD calls with the FM becoming suffixed. Also added were FM translators in Newburgh, Middletown, and Kingston, all of which either signed off or took on simulcasting new stations by 2000. By 1992, WRWD added former WBPM personality Mike Vincent to their afternoon roster, who later left WRWD by February 1996 for middays/Production Director for 103.1 WGNY-FM in Newburgh.

In 1996, WRWD-AM-FM and WBWZ were sold by Walker to Hudson Valley Radio Partners, a short-term holding company. The new ownership relieved morning man Terry Donovan of his duties and took the station to an all-local, current-leaning mainstream format and returned Mike Vincent to mornings from WGNY. Vincent would stay with WRWD until August 1999.

After WWLE was sold in 2000, Roberts sold the remnants of their group to Clear Channel Communications which assumed operational control in November. Under Clear Channel, WRWD became #1 in Dutchess and Ulster counties for the first time in 2002 - a feat repeated several times since then.

In 2005, WRWD added an AM simulcast when the former WELV changed format from standards to WRWD's country music format.  Following the announcement of the proposed Clear Channel decision to be acquired by a private equity group, WRWD (AM) ended its simulcast, which has moved to WRWB-FM (99.3 MHz) in Ellenville.

In 2011, Clear Channel Radio of the Hudson Valley, fired all local air talent outside of morning drive time and switched to the Premium Choice programming format (pre-recorded announcers from other markets), removing live jocks and locally programmed music.

In March 2012, CJ and Dee in the Morning were fired from their position in morning drive. They then hired Tommy Lee Walker, a former DJ to take over morning drive for a short run before they parted ways.

In June 2014, Party Marty Mitchell took over Morning Drive and the Program Director chair for WRWD.

In July 2018, Party Marty Mitchell was let go and the iHeart syndicated Bobby Bones show began in Morning Drive.

In September 2018, Chase Daniels (formerly of Saga Communications' WQNY in Ithaca) came on board to replace iHeart Premium Choice talent Boxer in the afternoon and Program the station replacing Marty Mitchell.

On July 1, 2019, Beth Christy (formerly of crosstown Townsquare Media-owned WKXP/WZAD) returned to WRWD to host the midday show replacing iHeart Premium Choice talent Billy Greenwood.

External links
 WRWD website
 

Country radio stations in the United States
Mass media in Ulster County, New York
Radio stations established in 1989
RWD-FM
IHeartMedia radio stations
1989 establishments in New York (state)